The Carinthia Statistical Region is a statistical region in northern Slovenia along the border with Austria.

The region is difficult to access and is poorly connected with the central part of Slovenia. The environment has been strongly affected by heavy industry in the valleys. The importance of agriculture is shown by the fact that the farms in the region are among the largest in the country. More than 90% of farms in the region are engaged in breeding livestock. Farm owners in the region have the youngest average age in Slovenia (53 years); they average eight years younger than farm owners in the Coastal–Karst Statistical Region. In 2013 the registered unemployment rate was higher than the national average. The difference between the registered unemployment rate for men and women was the highest among the statistical regions: for women it was 7 percentage points higher than for men. The share of five-year survivals among new enterprises was the highest here (59% of all new enterprises in 2012).

Cities and towns 
The Carinthia Statistical Region includes 5 cities and towns, the largest of which is Slovenj Gradec.

Municipalities
The Carinthia Statistical Region comprises the following 12 municipalities:

 Črna na Koroškem
 Dravograd
 Mežica
 Mislinja
 Muta
 Podvelka
 Prevalje
 Radlje ob Dravi
 Ravne na Koroškem
 Ribnica na Pohorju
 Slovenj Gradec
 Vuzenica

Demographics 
The population in 2020 was 70,755.

Economy 
Employment structure: 46.6% services, 49.6% industry, 3.8% agriculture.

Tourism 
The region attracts only 1.1% of the total number of tourists in Slovenia, most being from Slovenia (66.7%).

Transportation 
 Length of motorways: 0 km
 Length of other roads: 1,620.7 km

Sources 
 Slovenian regions in figures 2014

References 

Statistical regions of Slovenia